Pádraig Hampsey (born 15 April 1994) is a Gaelic footballer who plays for the Coalisland club and the Tyrone county team.	

He started at corner-back for Tyrone in the 2018 All-Ireland Final defeat to Dublin.	

In May 2021, he was named captain of Tyrone ahead of the NFL, and became the third Tyrone captain to lift the Sam Maguire Cup, following Tyrone's victory over Mayo in the 2021 All-Ireland Senior Football Championship Final.

Honours
Tyrone
 All-Ireland Senior Football Championship (1): 2021 (c)
 Ulster Senior Football Championship (3): 2016, 2017, 2021 (c)
 All-Ireland Under-21 Football Championship (1): 2015
 Ulster Under-21 Football Championship (1): 2015
 Ulster Minor Football Championship (1): 2012 (c)

Coalisland
 Tyrone Senior Football Championship (1): 2018

Individual
 All Star Award (2): 2018, 2021

References

Living people
Gaelic football backs
Tyrone inter-county Gaelic footballers
1994 births